Petrunino is a rural locality (a selo) and the administrative center of Petruninskoye Rural Settlement, Kamyshinsky District, Volgograd Oblast, Russia. The population was 942 as of 2010. There are 15 streets.

Geography 
Petrunino is located on the Volga Upland, on the Ilovlya River, 33 km west of Kamyshin (the district's administrative centre) by road. Baranovka is the nearest rural locality.

References 

Rural localities in Kamyshinsky District